Dolichochampsa is an extinct genus of eusuchian crocodylomorph. It is the type genus and only member of the family Dolichochampsidae. Fossils have been found in the Yacoraite Formation of Argentina and the El Molino Formation of Bolivia of Maastrichtian age. It had a distinctive slender snout. Because the material associated with the specimens is so fragmentary, its relationships with other eusuchians remain unknown. Jouve et al. (2020) assigned Dolichochampsa to Gavialoidea, making it the oldest known South American member of this clade.

References 

Maastrichtian life
Late Cretaceous crocodylomorphs of South America
Cretaceous Argentina
Fossils of Argentina
Salta Basin
Cretaceous Bolivia
Fossils of Bolivia
Fossil taxa described in 1980
Taxa named by Zulma Brandoni de Gasparini
Taxa named by Éric Buffetaut
Prehistoric pseudosuchian genera